António Jorge Santos Teixeira (born 2 April 1975) was a Portuguese futsal player who played as a pivot. Teixeira won one Portuguese futsal league with Sporting CP and played for the Portugal national team in the 1999 Euros and the 2000 World Cup.

References

External links

1975 births
Living people
Portuguese men's futsal players
Sporting CP futsal players